Krishnamachari is a given name and a surname. Notable people with the name include:

Krishnamachari Bharatan (born 1963), Indian former first-class cricketer
Bose Krishnamachari, internationally acclaimed Malayali painter and Artist-Curator based in Mumbai, India
T. T. Krishnamachari (1899–1974), Indian Finance Minister from 1956 to 1958 and from 1964 to 1966
V. T. Krishnamachari KCSI, KCIE (1881–1964), Indian civil servant and administrator
Krishnamachari Srikkanth (born 1959), known as Kris Srikkanth, former captain of the Indian cricket team
Krishnamachari Srinivasan (born 1966), Indian cricket umpire

See also
T. T. Krishnamachari Auditorium, auditorium situated in Mylapore, Chennai